Me'ona (lit. refuge place ) is a moshav in northern Israel. Located between Ma'alot-Tarshiha and Nahariya, it falls under the jurisdiction of Ma'ale Yosef Regional Council.

History
The village was established in 1949 by Jewish immigrants and refugees from North Africa and Jews from Romania.
Its name (as of the neighbouring moshav Ein Ya'akov) is taken from Deuteronomy 33:27-28
The Eternal Lord is Your refuge place ...

References

Moshavim
Populated places established in 1949
Populated places in Northern District (Israel)
1949 establishments in Israel
North African-Jewish culture in Israel
Romanian-Jewish culture in Israel